Main and Military Plazas Historic District is a historic district in San Antonio, Texas.  It was listed on the National Register of Historic Places in 1979, with a boundary increase in 2019.

The area encompasses the old Presidio San Antonio de Béxar, where the Spanish troops and the military governor of Texas were stationed.

It includes the following separately-listed Registered Historic Places, one or more of which are National Historic Landmarks:
Spanish Governor's Palace,
Vogel Belt Building Complex (restored for city offices),
Church of Nuestra Señora de la Candelaria y Guadalupe, also known as the Cathedral of San Fernando 
Bexar County Courthouse

See also
Holiday Inn Express Riverwalk Area, a contributing structure, formerly the county jail
Alamo Plaza Historic District

References

Citations

National Register of Historic Places in San Antonio
Historic districts on the National Register of Historic Places in Texas
Military in San Antonio
Spanish Texas